Eugene Chen or Chen Youren (July 2, 1878, San Fernando, Trinidad and Tobago – 20 May 1944, Shanghai), known in his youth as Eugene Bernard Achan, was a Chinese Trinidadian lawyer who in the 1920s became Chinese foreign minister. He was known for his success in promoting Sun Yat-sen's anti-imperialist foreign policies.

Early Biography

Childhood
Chen was born in San Fernando, Trinidad and Tobago to ethnic Chinese parents. He was the oldest of Chen Guangquan and Mary Longchallon's three sons. Both parents were Chinese immigrants to Trinidad. Chen's father, Chen Guangquan, was known as Joseph Chen or Achan. He immigrated to the French West Indies where he met his wife, Mary Longchallon (Marie Leong), also a Chinese immigrant. Joseph Chen, as well as the Longchallon family, had been required by the French authorities to accept the Catholic faith as a condition of immigration.

Education
After attending a Catholic school, St Mary's College, Trinidad, Chen qualified as a barrister and became known as one of the most highly skilled solicitors in the islands. The family did not speak Chinese at home; and, since there were no Chinese schools, he also did not learn to read Chinese. It was later said of him that his library was filled with Dickens, Shakespeare, Scott, and legal books, that he "spoke English as a scholar"; "except for his color, neither his living nor his habits were Chinese".

Professional life
After graduating from university, Chen eventually left Trinidad and Tobago to work in London, where he heard Sun Yat-sen speak at a rally against the Manchu government in China. Sun persuaded him to come to China and contribute his legal knowledge to the new Republic in 1912. Chen took the Trans-Siberian Railroad, and shared the journey with Wu Lien-te, a physician born in Malaysia. Learning that Chen had no Chinese name, Wu suggested "Youren" as the equivalent of "Eugene": "Youren" has the meaning of "friend of benevolence", and thus echoed his birth name both in meaning and (especially when pronounced in Teochew - Yujeng) sound.

After Sun was forced to flee to Japan in 1913, Chen remained in Peking, where he began a second career in journalism.  Chen edited the bilingual Peking Gazette 1913–1917, then founded the Shanghai Gazette, the first of what Sun envisioned as a network of newspapers across China. Chen had given up his initial support for Yuan Shikai and became a strong critic of the government, accusing it of "selling China", for which offence he was imprisoned. In 1918, Chen joined Sun in Canton to support the southern government, which he helped to represent at the Paris Peace Conference, where he opposed Japanese and British plans regarding China. In 1922, Chen became Sun's closest adviser on foreign affairs, and developed a leftist stance of anti-imperialist nationalism and support of Sun's alliance with the Soviet Union.

Chen's revolutionary diplomacy
Chen's diplomacy led one historian to call him "arguably China's most important diplomat of the 1920s and instrumental in the rights recovery movement." Chen welcomed Sun's alliance with the USSR, and worked harmoniously with Michael Borodin, the chief Soviet and foreign policy adviser to Sun Yat-Sen on the reorganization of the Nationalist Party at Canton in 1923.  After Sun's death, Chen was elected to the Central Executive Committee of Kuomintang, Nationalist Minister for Foreign affairs at Canton, and Ruler of Hankow, all being achieved in 1926 he was forced to resign in April 1927.  Over the next two years, Chen lodged several protests with the American and UK governments over their concessions in China, as well as negotiating with the British colonial authorities from British Raj over labor strikes.  When Chiang Kai-shek's Northern Expedition appeared on the verge of unifying the country, Chen joined the rival Nationalist government at Wuhan.

In January 1927, the Nationalists forcibly took control over the British concession in Wuhan, and when violent crowds also took the foreign concession at Kiukiang, foreign warships gathered at Shanghai. Chen's negotiations with the British led in February 1927  to the Chen-O'Malley Agreement which provided for a combined British-Chinese administration of the concession. In 1929 the British concession in Wuhan formally came to an end. From then on it was administered by the Chinese authorities as the Third Special Area. While the event as such was comparatively minor, as was the territory involved, this nevertheless constituted both a diplomatic humiliation as well as an ominous precedent for the British government. In March 1927, with the rapidly approaching National Revolutionary Army (NRA) about to reach Nanjing there was an outbreak of violence against foreigners, now known as the Nanjing Incident, and Chiang Kai-shek launched White Terror attacks on Communists in Shanghai. Chen sent Borodin, his sons Percy Chen and Jack Chen, and the American leftist journalist Anna Louise Strong in an automotive convoy across Central Asia to Moscow. He, his daughters Si-lan and Yolanda, Mme. Sun Yat-sen, and the American journalist Rayna Prohme traveled from Shanghai to Vladivostok, and once again by Trans-Siberian Railway to Moscow.

Life working at Moscow from 1928 was far from easy. After an initial warm public reception, Joseph Stalin showed little tolerance for living symbols of the Soviet failure in China. Chen was frustrated at the Russians attempting to establish a leftist Chinese front, and soon left Moscow.  After a period of exile he went to Hong Kong before being appointed foreign minister.  After brief service with governments in China which challenged the Nanking government, Chen was finally expelled from the Kuomintang for serving as foreign minister in the Fukien Rebellion of 1934. He again headed to Europe for refuge at Paris, but returned to Hong Kong. He was taken to Shanghai in the spring of 1942 in hopes of persuading him to support the Japanese puppet government, but he remained loudly critical of that "pack of liars" until his death in May, 1944, at the age of 66.

Personal life
In 1899, Chen married Agatha Alphosin Ganteaume (1878–1926), known as Aisy, a French Creole whose wealthy father owned one of the largest estates in Trinidad. They had eight children, four of whom survived childhood: Percy Chen (1901–1986), a lawyer, worked with his father for many years; Sylvia (Silan) Chen (1905–1996), an internationally known dancer; Yolanda (Yulen) Chen (1913–2006), who stayed in the USSR for the rest of her life and came to prominence as a camerawoman; and Jack Chen (1908–1995), who made an international reputation as a journalistic cartoonist and relief worker. In 1958 Jack married Chen Yuan-tsung. Eugene Chen's great-granddaughter is Yolanda Chen, a retired athlete and daughter of Yevgeniy Chen.

Aisy died of breast cancer in May 1926. Chen and Georgette Chen were married in 1930 and remained together until his death in 1944.

Sources
 Percy Chen, China called Me: My Life Inside the Chinese Revolution. Boston: Little Brown, 1979. 423p. . A memoir by Eugene Chen's son, including accounts of his father's activities in 1920s politics and the automobile caravan from China to Moscow in 1927.
 Yuan-Tsung Chen. Return to the Middle Kingdom: One Family, Three Revolutionaries, and the Birth of Modern China. New York: Union Square Press, 2008. . Google Books A memoir by Jack Chen's wife which intertwines family and national history from the early 1900s to the end of the 20th century.
Si-lan Chen Leyda, Footsteps to History (New York: Dance Horizons, 1984). A memoir by Eugene Chen's daughter of her life in international dance, including study in the Soviet Union.
Reviewed by Renée Renouf at JSTOR 
 钱玉莉 (Yuli Qian), 陈友仁传 (Chen Youren Zhuan) (Shijiazhuang: Hebei ren min chu ban she, 1999 ).

Sources
 "Roots and Branches," (website of J. Acham-Chen (Eugene Chen's grandson) 
 Colonial Office No. 36535/1927 15 February 1927, including: 1) Copy secret despatch of 20 January from Governor of Trinidad furnishing particulars regarding family of Mr. Ch’en who was for a long time resident in the colony; Minutes (i.e. Notes): “This record does not inspire confidence in Mr. Chen, who I should think will prove to be one of the ephemeral phenomena of Chinese politics”;  Very much of an adventurer in type. 2)    “Report,: H.A. Byatt, Governor [Trinidad]; 3) “Note supplied by Mr. H. Noble Hall, one time correspondent of the Times at Washington on the early career and character of Chen in Trinidad”; 3) Cutting from “Far Eastern Times, by W. Sheldon Ridge; “Life Story of Eugene Chen” (furnished by American Legation, July 1927).

References

External links
 

Trinidad and Tobago people of Chinese descent
Chinese Roman Catholics
People from Meixian District
Trinidad and Tobago Roman Catholics
Foreign Ministers of the Republic of China
Hakka people
Chinese Christians
People of the Northern Expedition
People of the Chinese Civil War
1872 births
1944 deaths
20th-century Trinidad and Tobago lawyers
People from San Fernando, Trinidad and Tobago
Burials at Babaoshan Revolutionary Cemetery
19th-century Trinidad and Tobago lawyers